Florencia de Mora is a city in northern Peru, capital of the district Florencia de Mora in Trujillo Province of the region La Libertad. This city is located some 3 km north of the Historic Centre of Trujillo city.

Nearby cities
Trujillo, Peru
La Esperanza

See also
La Libertad Region
Simbal
Moche River

References

External links
Location of Florencia de Mora by Wikimapia

Populated places in La Libertad Region
Cities in La Libertad Region
Localities of Trujillo, Peru